Pleasant Point, also known as Crouches Creek Plantation, is a historic home located near Scotland, Surry County, Virginia.  It was built about 1724, and is a -story, double pile frame dwelling with brick ends.  It has a gable roof and originally had a hall-parlor plan, later modified to a central-hall plan. The interior woodwork was largely replaced in the 1950s, although it retains some original doors, framing and original bowfat in the dining room.  Also on the property are a contributing dairy, smokehouse, laundry and a four-step terrace leading down to the bluffs overlooking the James River.

It was listed on the National Register of Historic Places in 1976.

References

External links
Point Pleasant, Surry County Courthouse vicinity, Surry, Surry County, VA: 2 photos and 1 measured drawing at Historic American Buildings Survey

Historic American Buildings Survey in Virginia
Houses on the National Register of Historic Places in Virginia
Houses completed in 1724
National Register of Historic Places in Surry County, Virginia
Houses in Surry County, Virginia
1724 establishments in the Thirteen Colonies